Westside is the largest city and de facto capital of Gibraltar. It lies between the western slopes of the Rock of Gibraltar and the eastern shores of the Bay of Gibraltar. In 2012, it was inhabited by 26,572 people and contained 78.15% of the territory's population of 34,000.

Division 
The city is divided into six Major Residential Areas. They are: North District, the Reclamation Areas, Sandpits Area, South District, Town Area, and Upper Town.

Demographics

References

Capitals of British Overseas Territories
Areas of Gibraltar
Capitals in Europe